Tatsiana Hramyka (born April 4, 1986) is a Belarusian female weightlifter.
She competed in the women's +75 kg category in the Strasbourg 2007 European Weightlifting Championships, placing fourth.

References

Belarusian female weightlifters
Living people
1986 births
Place of birth missing (living people)
21st-century Belarusian women